The Kal-Q-Lated Risk was a musical group from Featherston, New Zealand. The band consists of Ian Taylor (Lead Vocals), Phil Hope (Lead Guitar)
Bernie Carey (Organ / Vocals), Dave Cameron (Bass Guitar / Vocals) Laki Apelu (Guitar) and Barry Rushton (Drums.) In early 1969, Upper Hutt guitarist Phil Hope replaced Apelu, who had returned to Samoa at short notice.

Discography

Albums

Singles

Awards  
Loxene Golden Disc Award 1970

References 

Musical groups established in 1967
Musical groups disestablished in the 1970s
New Zealand musical groups